Hot Boxing is the second studio album by Magnapop, released in 1994. "Lay It Down" and "Slowly, Slowly" were released as singles. Music videos were created for "Lay It Down", "Slowly, Slowly", and "Texas". Having Priority release the album was a radical departure from the label's earlier emphasis on rap.

Track listing
All songs written by Linda Hopper and Ruthie Morris.
Side one
"Slowly, Slowly" – 3:35
"Texas" – 4:01
"Lay It Down" – 2:59
"Here It Comes" – 2:48
"Piece of Cake" – 2:49
"Free Mud" – 2:00
"Leo" – 2:37

Side two
"The Crush" – 3:22
"Ride" – 2:30
"In the Way" – 2:32
"Idiot Song" – 1:55
"Get It Right" – 1:52
"Emergency" – 4:00
"Skinburns" – 4:24

Special edition bonus tracks
"Merry" (Acoustic) – 3:26
"Pretty Awful" – 2:24

Personnel
Magnapop
Linda Hopper – lead vocals
David McNair – drums
Ruthie Morris – guitar, backing vocals
Shannon Mulvaney – bass guitar

Production staff
David Collins – remastering at A&M Studios
Valerie Raimonde – design
Ruth Leitman – art direction, photography
Magnapop – production on "Merry" (Acoustic)
Bob Mould – production
Jim Wilson – engineering

Release history
The album was initially released on Priority Records in the United States and Play It Again Sam in the United Kingdom, with the Japanese edition published by King; the special edition with bonus tracks was published in The Netherlands by Play It Again Sam.

†Special edition with bonus tracks

References

External links
Official site

Hot Boxing at Discogs

1994 albums
Albums produced by Bob Mould
King Records (Japan) albums
Magnapop albums
PIAS Recordings albums
Priority Records albums